Kenneth Howard (born 2 June 1941) is a former English cricketer active from 1958 to 1966 who played for Lancashire. He was born in Manchester. He appeared in 61 first-class matches as a lefthanded batsman who bowled right arm off break. He scored 395 runs with a highest score of 23 and held 57 catches. He took 104 wickets with a best analysis of seven for 53.

Notes

1941 births
English cricketers
Lancashire cricketers
Living people